In mathematics, the Riemann series theorem (also called the Riemann rearrangement theorem), named after 19th-century German mathematician Bernhard Riemann, says that if an infinite series of real numbers is conditionally convergent, then its terms can be arranged in a permutation so that the new series converges to an arbitrary real number, or diverges. This implies that a series of real numbers is absolutely convergent if and only if it is unconditionally convergent.

As an example, the series 1 − 1 + 1/2 − 1/2 + 1/3 − 1/3 + ⋯ converges to 0 (for a sufficiently large number of terms, the partial sum gets arbitrarily near to 0); but replacing all terms with their absolute values gives 1 + 1 + 1/2 + 1/2 + 1/3 + 1/3 + ⋯, which sums to infinity. Thus the original series is conditionally convergent, and can be rearranged (by taking the first two positive terms followed by the first negative term, followed by the next two positive terms and then the next negative term, etc.) to give a series that converges to a different sum: 1 + 1/2 − 1 + 1/3 + 1/4 − 1/2 + ⋯ = ln 2. More generally, using this procedure with p positives followed by q negatives gives the sum ln(p/q). Other rearrangements give other finite sums or do not converge to any sum.

History
It is a basic result that the sum of finitely many numbers does not depend on the order in which they are added. For example, . The observation that the sum of an infinite sequence of numbers can depend on the ordering of the summands is commonly attributed to Augustin-Louis Cauchy in 1833. He analyzed the alternating harmonic series, showing that certain rearrangements of its summands result in different limits. Around the same time, Peter Gustav Lejeune Dirichlet highlighted that such phenomena is ruled out in the context of absolute convergence, and gave further examples of Cauchy's phenomena for some other series which fail to be absolutely convergent.

In the course of his analysis of Fourier series and the theory of Riemann integration, Bernhard Riemann gave a full characterization of the rearrangement phenomena. He proved that in the case of a convergent series which does not converge absolutely (known as conditional convergence), rearrangements can be found so that the new series converges to any arbitrarily prescribed real number. Riemann's theorem is now considered as a basic part of the field of mathematical analysis.

For any series, one may consider the set of all possible sums, corresponding to all possible rearrangements of the summands. Riemann's theorem can be formulated as saying that, for a series of real numbers, this set is either empty, a single point (in the case of absolute convergence), or the entire real number line (in the case of conditional convergence). In this formulation, Riemann's theorem was extended by Paul Lévy and Ernst Steinitz to series whose summands are complex numbers or, even more generally, elements of a finite-dimensional real vector space. They proved that the set of possible sums forms a real affine subspace. Extensions of the Lévy–Steinitz theorem to series in infinite-dimensional spaces have been considered by a number of authors.

Definitions
A series  converges if there exists a value  such that the sequence of the partial sums

That is, for any ε > 0, there exists an integer N such that if n ≥ N, then

A series converges conditionally if the series  converges but the series  diverges.

A permutation is simply a bijection from the set of positive integers to itself. This means that if  is a permutation, then for any positive integer  there exists exactly one positive integer  such that  In particular, if , then .

Statement of the theorem

Suppose that  is a sequence of real numbers, and that  is conditionally convergent. Let  be a real number. Then there exists a permutation  such that

There also exists a permutation  such that

Alternating harmonic series

Changing the sum
The alternating harmonic series is a classic example of a conditionally convergent series:

is convergent, whereas

is the ordinary harmonic series, which diverges. One instance of this is as follows. Begin with the series written in the usual order,

and rearrange the terms:

where the pattern is: the first two terms are 1 and −1/2, whose sum is 1/2. The next term is −1/4.
The next two terms are 1/3 and −1/6, whose sum is 1/6. The next term is −1/8.
The next two terms are 1/5 and −1/10, whose sum is 1/10.
In general, the sum is composed of blocks of three:

This is indeed a rearrangement of the alternating harmonic series: every odd integer occurs once positively, and the even integers occur once each, negatively (half of them as multiples of 4, the other half as twice odd integers).  Since

this series can in fact be written:

which is half the usual sum.

Getting an arbitrary sum
An efficient way to recover and generalize the result of the previous section is to use the fact that

where γ is the Euler–Mascheroni constant, and where the notation o(1) denotes a quantity that depends upon the current variable (here, the variable is n) in such a way that this quantity goes to 0 when the variable tends to infinity.

It follows that the sum of q even terms satisfies

and by taking the difference, one sees that the sum of p odd terms satisfies

Then the partial sum of order (a+b)n of this rearranged series contains  positive odd terms and  negative even terms, hence

It follows that the sum of this rearranged series is

Suppose now that, more generally, a rearranged series of the alternating harmonic series is organized in such a way that the ratio  between the number of positive and negative terms in the partial sum of order n tends to a positive limit r.  Then, the sum of such a rearrangement will be

and this explains that any real number x can be obtained as sum of a rearranged series of the alternating harmonic series: it suffices to form a rearrangement for which the limit r is equal .

Proof

Existence of a rearrangement that sums to any positive real M
Riemann's description of the theorem and its proof reads in full:

This can be given more detail as follows. Recall that a conditionally convergent series of real terms has both infinitely many negative terms and infinitely many positive terms.

That is, the series  includes all an positive, with all negative terms replaced by zeroes, and the series  includes all an negative, with all positive terms replaced by zeroes. Since  is conditionally convergent, both the 'positive' and the 'negative' series diverge. Let  be any real number. Take just enough of the positive terms  so that their sum exceeds . That is, let  be the smallest positive integer such that

Now let  be the smallest positive integer such that

Now continue inductively, defining  as the smallest integer larger than  such that

and so on. The result may be viewed as a new sequence 

This can be seen from the fact that for any ,

Since the 'th, 'th, ...

Those entries of the original sequence which are zero will appear twice in the new sequence (once in the 'positive' sequence and once in the 'negative' sequence), and every second such appearance can be removed, which does not affect the summation in any way. The new sequence is thus a permutation of the original sequence.

Existence of a rearrangement that diverges to infinity
Let  be a conditionally convergent series.

The above proof of Riemann's original formulation only needs to be modified so that  is selected as the smallest integer larger than  such that

and with  selected as the smallest integer larger than  such that

Since  converges to zero as  increases, for sufficiently large  there is 

and this proves (just as with the analysis of convergence above) that the sequence of partial sums of the new sequence diverge to infinity.

Existence of a rearrangement that fails to approach any limit, finite or infinite 
The above proof only needs to be modified so that  is selected as the smallest integer larger than  such that

and with  selected as the smallest integer larger than  such that

Generalizations

Sierpiński theorem 

That is, we letWith this notation, we have:

 If  is finite, then . Here  means symmetric difference.
 If  then .
 If the series is an absolutely convergent sum, then  for any .
 If the series is a conditionally convergent sum, then by Riemann series theorem, .

Sierpiński proved that rearranging only the positive terms one can obtain a series converging to any prescribed value less than or equal to the sum of the original series, but larger values in general can not be attained. That is, let  be a conditionally convergent sum, then  contains , but there is no guarantee that it contains any other number.

Let  be the set of all asymptotic density zero sets , that is, .

Filipów and Szuca proved that other ideals also have this property.

Steinitz's theorem 

Given a converging series of complex numbers, several cases can occur when considering the set of possible sums for all series  obtained by rearranging (permuting) the terms of that series:

 the series  may converge unconditionally; then, all rearranged series converge, and have the same sum: the set of sums of the rearranged series reduces to one point;
 the series may fail to converge unconditionally;  if S denotes the set of sums of those rearranged series that converge, then, either the set S is a line L in the complex plane C, of the form  or the set S is the whole complex plane C.

More generally, given a converging series of vectors in a finite-dimensional real vector space E, the set of sums of converging rearranged series is an affine subspace of E.

See also

References

External links
 

Mathematical series
Theorems in analysis
Permutations
Summability theory
Bernhard Riemann